Bernd Kroschewski (born 24 September 1970) is a German snowboarder. He competed in the men's giant slalom event at the 1998 Winter Olympics.

References

External links
 

1970 births
Living people
German male snowboarders
Olympic snowboarders of Germany
Snowboarders at the 1998 Winter Olympics
People from Konstanz
Sportspeople from Freiburg (region)
20th-century German people